Raith is a dispersed rural community and unincorporated area in geographic Golding Township in the Unorganized Part of Thunder Bay District in Northwestern Ontario, Canada.

Geography
The community lies at the watershed divide between the Great Lakes Basin/Saint Lawrence River drainage basin and the Hudson Bay drainage basin, a fact highlighted by an Ontario Heritage Trust Blue Plaque. The Oskondaga River, on the Great Lakes basin side of the divide, begins at Raith.

Transportation
The community is Ontario Highway 17, at this point part of the Trans-Canada Highway, between Upsala to the northwest and Shabaqua Corners to the south. There are also two railway lines: the Canadian Pacific Railway transcontinental main line, in operation; and the Canadian National Railway Graham Subdivision main line, originally built as part of the National Transcontinental Railway, now abandoned.

References

Other map sources:

Communities in Thunder Bay District